Tazehabad (also Romanized as Tāzehābād; also known as Tāzābād-e Jangāh and Tāzehābād-e Jangāh) is a village in Bibalan Rural District, Kelachay District, Rudsar County, Gilan Province, Iran. At the 2006 census, its population was 422, in 115 families.

References 

Populated places in Rudsar County